Haisla may refer to:
 Haisla people, an indigenous people living in Kitamaat, British Columbia, Canada.
 Haisla language, their northern Wakashan language.
 Haisla Nation, a First Nations band government in British Columbia, Canada.